Robert Frederick Smith (born 22 May 1948) is an Australian politician. He was a Labor Party member of the Victorian Legislative Council from 1999 to 2010, representing South Eastern Metropolitan Region.

Smith was born in England, and attended St Brendan's Public school 1958–63 and Salisbury High School in Brisbane, Queensland, 1963–65. In 1965 he became a permanent member of the Royal Australian Navy, where he remained until 1980, when he became the plant operator of a steel mill. In 1989, he became a union leader.

Smith was elected to the Legislative Council in the 1999 Victorian state election, representing Chelsea Province. When the Legislative Council was reformed in 2006, he won preselection for the third position on the Labor ticket for South Eastern Metropolitan, and was elected. In December 2006 he became President of the Legislative Council. In the 2010 election, Smith ran for a seat in the Western Metropolitan Region but failed to win election.

References

1948 births
Living people
Members of the Victorian Legislative Council
Members of the Victorian Legislative Council for South Eastern Metropolitan Region
Presidents of the Victorian Legislative Council
Australian Labor Party members of the Parliament of Victoria
Australian trade unionists
Royal Australian Navy personnel
English emigrants to Australia
21st-century Australian politicians